Mr Medici is a Hong Kong-based Thoroughbred racehorse.

In the season of 2009–2010, he won the HKG1 Standard and Chartered Champions and Chater Cup. He also is one of the nominees of Hong Kong Horse of the Year.

Profile
 Sire: Medicean
 Dam: Way For Life
 Dam's Sire: Platini
 Sex: Horse
 Country : 
 Colour : Bay
 Owner :   Mr & Mrs Allen Shi Lop Tak  
 Trainer : Peter L. Ho
 Record : (No. of 1-2-3-Starts) 3-10-7-54 (As of 18 May 2015)
 Earnings :  HK$19,391,750 (As of 18 May 2015)

References
 The Hong Kong Jockey Club – Mr Medici Racing Record
 The Hong Kong Jockey Club

Racehorses trained in Hong Kong
Hong Kong racehorses
Racehorses bred in Ireland
2005 racehorse births
Thoroughbred family 21-a